The Africa Open Data Conference is a biennial conference that convenes governments agencies, individuals and organizations with interest in creating and releasing public data sets for easy access and use by ordinary citizens in Africa to share advances in open data and form new collaborations.

Overview

References

Open government